Selbustrand is a village in the municipality of Selbu in Trøndelag county, Norway. The Selbustrand Church is located in this village.

References

Villages in Trøndelag
Selbu